The Ecclesiastical Leases Act 1575 (18 Eliz 1 c 11) was an Act of the Parliament of England.

The entire Act was repealed by section 1(1) of, and Group 1 of Part II of Schedule 1 to, the Statute Law (Repeals) Act 1998.

References
Halsbury's Statutes,

External links
The Ecclesiastical Leases Act 1575, as amended, from the National Archives.
The Ecclesiastical Leases Act 1575, revised as of 1 February 1991, from the National Archives.

Acts of the Parliament of England (1485–1603)
1575 in law
1575 in England